James Bunbury (born 21 February 1972), known as Turtle Bunbury, is an Irish author, historian, and television presenter. He has published a number of books such as the Vanishing Ireland series, Easter Dawn -The 1916 Rising, The Glorious Madness (short-listed for Best Irish-published Book of the Year 2014) and 1847 – A Chronicle of Genius, Generosity & Savagery.

Career 
Bunbury is the third son of Thomas Bunbury, 5th Baron Rathdonnell and Jessica Harriet, daughter of George Gilbert Butler, of Scatorish, Bennettsbridge, County Kilkenny, Ireland (brother of the essayist Hubert Butler). He was raised at Lisnavagh House, Rathvilly, County Carlow, in Ireland, and received his early education locally and at Castle Park School in Dublin. He later studied at Glenalmond College, Perthshire, Scotland, before going on to Trinity College, Dublin and the University of Groningen in the Netherlands.

From 1996 to 1998 he lived in Hong Kong, working as a freelance correspondent with the South China Morning Post and Business News Indochina.

Bunbury was a co-presenter of The Genealogy Roadshow on RTÉ television in 2011 and 2014. He also presented Hidden Histories on Newstalk Radio in 2013. He co-wrote the 2008 documentary John Henry Foley: Sculptor of the Empire. He has also appeared on BBC1's Wogan's Ireland, and episodes of the American version and Irish version of the Who Do You Think You Are? TV series.

BBC History Magazine described him as "a skilled storyteller", and novelist Marjorie Quarton described Bunbury as being "one of the most versatile authors of his generation … a serious author with a light touch in writing". 

His work has appeared in National Geographic Traveler, Daily Beast, The Australian, The Guardian and the Irish Times.

In 2019, Bunbury began a collaboration with Iarnród Éireann / Irish Rail and Flahavan's for a project called ‘Past Tracks,’ an exhibition of historic panels that went on semi-permanent display in several railway stations around Ireland.

Turtle Bunbury is married to the novelist Ally Bunbury with whom he lives in County Carlow.

Vanishing Ireland     

In 2001 Bunbury began work on the Vanishing Ireland project with photographer James Fennell. The project produced four books, and a review in the Irish Independent of the first book noted how it was "written with sympathy, understanding and gentle humour". Three of the books were short-listed for Best Irish-Published Book of the Year at the Irish Book Awards.

Works 

 The Landed Gentry & Aristocracy of Co. Kildare (Irish Family Names, 2004) 
 The Landed Gentry & Aristocracy of Co. Wicklow (Irish Family Names, 2005) 
 Living in Sri Lanka (Thames & Hudson, 2006), with James Fennell. 
 Vanishing Ireland (Hodder Headline, 2006), with James Fennell. 
 The Irish Pub (Thames & Hudson, 2008) with James Fennell. 
 Dublin Docklands – An Urban Voyage (Montague, 2009). 
 Vanishing Ireland 2 (Hodder Headline, 2009), with James Fennell. 
 Sporting Legends of Ireland (Mainstream, 2010) with James Fennell. 
 Vanishing Ireland 3 (Hachette, 2011), with James Fennell. 
 Dublin from the Etihad Skyline (GAA Museum, 2012), .
 Vanishing Ireland 4 (Hachette, 2013), with James Fennell. 
 The Glorious Madness – Tales of the Irish & the Great War (Gill & Macmillan, 2014) 
 Easter Dawn – The 1916 Rising (Mercier Press, 2015). 
 1847 – A Chronicle of Genius, Generosity & Savagery (Gill, 2016). 
 Adare Manor : The Renaissance of an Irish Country House (Adare Manor Publishing, 2019) 
 Ireland's Forgotten Past (Thames & Hudson, 2020) 
 The Irish Diaspora: Tales of Emigration, Exile and Imperialism (Thames & Hudson, 2021)

References

1972 births
Living people
21st-century Irish historians
Irish non-fiction writers
Alumni of Trinity College Dublin
University of Groningen alumni
People from County Carlow
People educated at Glenalmond College